Kim Yeong-jun (born 31 August 1940) is a South Korean volleyball player. He competed in the men's tournament at the 1964 Summer Olympics.

References

1940 births
Living people
South Korean men's volleyball players
Olympic volleyball players of South Korea
Volleyball players at the 1964 Summer Olympics
Place of birth missing (living people)